Josef Fransson (born 25 September 1978) is a Swedish politician who has served as an MP in the Riksdag for the Sweden Democrats party since 2010.

Fransson graduated from Örebro University from 2003 with a degree in engineering. In 2010, Fransson was elected to parliament for the Malmö constituency. In the Riksdag, he has served as a member of the committees on Environment and Agriculture and traffic.

References 

Living people
1978 births
21st-century Swedish engineers
Örebro University alumni
Politicians from Malmö
21st-century Swedish politicians
Members of the Riksdag 2010–2014
Members of the Riksdag 2014–2018
Members of the Riksdag 2018–2022
Members of the Riksdag from the Sweden Democrats
Members of the Riksdag 2022–2026